Granada Hills is a suburban neighborhood in the San Fernando Valley region of the City of Los Angeles. The community has a sports program and a range of city recreation centers. The neighborhood has fourteen public and ten private schools.

History
The community began as dairy farm and orchard known as the Sunshine Ranch which grew apricots, oranges, walnuts and beans. Vestiges of former citrus groves can still be seen in orange, lemon or grapefruit trees in many residential yards. In 1916, the San Fernando Valley's first oil well was drilled in what is now Granada Hills. The oil well was located at the northern tip of Zelzah Avenue. Granada Hills was founded in 1926 as "Granada;" the "Hills" portion of the name was added 15 years later.

Geography and climate
Granada Hills is located at the foothills of the Santa Susana Mountains, north of North Hills, Northridge, west of Mission Hills and Sylmar, and east of the Porter Ranch neighborhoods of Los Angeles. The Ronald Reagan Freeway (State Route 118) runs through its southern area. Van Norman Reservoir, the southern terminus of the Los Angeles Aqueduct, is located in Granada Hills.

Demographics
The 2000 U.S. census counted 50,535 residents in the 15.11-square-mile neighborhood—or 3,344 people per square mile. In 2008, the city estimated that the population had increased to 53,998, a density of 3,574 people per square mile. In 2000 the median age for residents was 37.

The neighborhood is ethnically diverse and includes whites, 55.5%; Latinos, 20.6%; Asians, 16.3%; blacks, 3.4%; and others, 4.2%.  Korea (16.0%) and Mexico (13.8%) were the most common places of birth for 29.2% of the residents who were born abroad.

The median yearly household income in 2008 was $83,911. Renters occupied 26.4% of the housing stock. The average household size of 2.9 people was considered average for Los Angeles. The percentages of married men (60.4%) and women (58.5%) were among the county's highest.  There were 4,032 veterans, or 10.5% of the population, a high proportion compared to the rest of the city.

Arts and culture

Architecture

Granada Hills is composed mostly of Mid-century modern architecture. Of note is the "Balboa Highlands" tract built by iconic developer Joseph Eichler as well as the Knollwood Country Club area and Knollwood Grove tract. Many of these homes, which are North of Rinaldi/West of Balboa, have been featured in movies, commercials, magazine pictorials and appear in books about Eichler or mid-century architecture.

Historical landmarks

White Oak Avenue, between San Fernando Mission and San Jose Street was declared a Los Angeles Historic-Cultural Monument on August 3, 1966, for the 101 Deodar Cedar trees that line the street.  The trees are native to the Himalayas and appreciated for their size, beauty and timber. White Oak Avenue trees were used as the back-drop in the flying bicycle scenes in the 1982 film E.T. the Extra-Terrestrial.

Sports
Granada Hills Charter High School's stadium, the John Elway Stadium (named after the quarterback, an alumnus), is home to the Los Angeles Rampage women's soccer team and formerly home to the San Fernando Valley Quakes.

In 1963, the Granada Hills Little League won the Little League World Championship in baseball.

Parks and recreation
O'Melveny Park, the second largest park in Los Angeles, consists of a large undeveloped area and a much smaller developed section with several dozen citrus trees, a small intermittent stream, and grass and picnic areas.  This  park includes hiking trails and fire roads, including a grassy promontory from which a view of the northeastern portion of the San Fernando Valley may be seen.
Mission Point and its environs are popular mountain biking and hiking areas.  The view from the top of Mission Point (called "Mission Peak" by many residents), the highest point in Granada Hills, is striking, taking in most of the San Fernando Valley.  In clear weather, one can see the Pacific Ocean and Downtown Los Angeles.  The area around the peak is home to deer, golden eagle, bobcats, mountain lions, raccoons, and coyotes.

The Granada Hills Recreation Center (also known as Petit Park) features an auditorium, baseball diamonds, basketball courts, children's play areas, a gym, picnic tables, tennis courts, classrooms, a dance room and a library.  Programs are offered in sports, and arts and crafts.

Zelzah Park, an unstaffed park, has a bridle path, a children's play area, and picnic tables.

Government

Local
City Council
Los Angeles City Council District 12 encompasses Granada Hills, with councilmember John Lee serving.

Neighborhood Councils
Granada Hills is served by two Neighborhood Councils:
Granada Hills North Neighborhood Council —  Representing the area bounded by Los Angeles County line to the north, Aliso Canyon to the west (west of Zelzah), Interstate 5 and Interstate 405 to the east and California 118 to the south. Formed in fall, 2002.
Granada Hills South Neighborhood Council —  Representing the area bounded by California 118 to the north, Lindsey and Aliso Canyon to the west, Interstate 405 to the east, and Devonshire Street to the south.

County, state and federal
Granada Hills is in California's 30th congressional district as of 2013 and represented by Democrat Brad Sherman.  It was in the 38th State Assembly district, and the 20th State Senate district until the 2014 redistricting.

Education
Thirty-two percent of Granada Hills residents aged 25 and older have earned a four-year degree by 2000, an average percentage for the city.

Schools

Schools within the Granada Hills boundaries are:

Public
 John F. Kennedy High School, 11254 Gothic Avenue
 Granada Hills Charter High School (formerly Granada Hills High School), 10535 Zelzah Avenue
 Jane Addams High School (continuation high school), 16341 Donmetz Street
 North Valley Charter Academy, 16651-A Rinaldi Street
 Valley Academy of Arts and Sciences, 10445 Balboa Boulevard
 George K. Porter Middle School, 15960 Kingsbury Street
 Robert Frost Middle School, 12314 Bradford Place
 Patrick Henry Middle School, 17340 San Jose Street
 El Oro Way Elementary Charter School, 12230 El Oro Way
 Knollwood Elementary School, 11822 Gerald Avenue
 Danube Avenue Elementary School, 11220 Danube Avenue
 Tulsa Street Elementary School, 10900 Hayvenhurst Avenue
 Haskell Elementary School, 15850 Tulsa Street
 Van Gogh Street Elementary School, 17160 Van Gogh Street
 Granada Elementary Community Charter School, 17170 Tribune Street
 Rinaldi Adult Center (Adult School), 17540 Rinaldi Street #6

Private
 St. Euphrasia School, Elementary, 17637 Mayerling Street
 Jewish Educational Trade School, 16601 Rinaldi Street
 Concordia Schools, preschool–8th grade, 16603 San Fernando Mission Boulevard
 Granada Hills Baptist Elementary School, 10949 Zelzah Avenue
 De La Salle Elementary School, 16535 Chatsworth Street
 Abraham Joshua Heschel Day School (elementary), 17701 Devonshire Street
 Pinecrest/Northridge School (elementary), 17081 Devonshire Street
 Heritage Christian School (formerly Hillcrest) Christian School, 17531 Rinaldi Street (K–8), 10949 Zelzah Street (Preschool)
 Heritage Christian School (formerly Los Angeles Baptist High School), 9825 Woodley Ave.
 Iqra Elementary School, 11439 Encino Ave, Granada Hills, CA 91344 (preschool–7th)

Infrastructure

Public services
Los Angeles Fire Department Stations 18 (Knollwood/Granada Hills) and 87 (Granada Hills) are in the area.

Granada Hills is served by the Los Angeles Police Department Devonshire Community Police Station.

Health care
The Los Angeles County Department of Health Services operates the Pacoima Health Center in Pacoima, serving Granada Hills.

Postal service
The United States Postal Service Granada Hills Post Office is located at 18039 Chatsworth Street.

Libraries
Los Angeles Public Library operates the Granada Hills Branch and is located in North Hills.

Notable people 

 Hal Bernson, Los Angeles City Council member who fought the Sunshine Canyon project in the 1980s and 1990s
 Ryan Braun, professional baseball player, Granada Hills High School alumnus
 Jeff Bregel, professional football player, John F. Kennedy High School alumnus
 Chao-Li Chi, actor
 John Elway, Denver Broncos quarterback
 Cuba Gooding Jr., actor, Kennedy High School alumnus
 Stuart Gray, professional basketball player, John F. Kennedy High School alumnus
 Maurice Greene, track athlete
 Ashley Judd, actress, was born in Granada Hills.
 Michaele Pride-Wells (born 1956), architect and educator; born and raised in Granada Hills
 Jim Rodnunsky, technician, inventor of the Cablecam system.
 C. J. Sanders, football player at the University of Notre Dame
 Frank Wilcox, actor and "honorary mayor" of Granada Hills in the 1960s.
 Steve Yeager (born 1948), Major League Baseball catcher

See also  

 List of districts and neighborhoods in Los Angeles

References

External links

 Granada Hills Chamber of Commerce
 Granada Hills North Neighborhood Council
 Granada Hills South Neighborhood Council
 Granada Hills History Project (stopped in 2007) (archived 2014-07-08)
 GigaGranadaHills.com, The Granada Hills Blog
 Granada Hills crime map and statistics

 
Communities in the San Fernando Valley
Neighborhoods in Los Angeles
1927 establishments in California
Populated places established in 1927